Hlonipha Mokoena is a South African historian at the Wits Institute for Social and Economic Research of the University of the Witwatersrand. She is a specialist is South African intellectual history. She formerly worked in the anthropology department at Columbia University. She received her PhD from the University of Cape Town in 2005. Her book, Magema Fuze: The Making of a Kholwa Intellectual, is about Magema Magwaza Fuze, the first Zulu-speaker to publish a book in the language.

Selected publications
 "An Assembly of Readers: Magema Fuze and His Ilanga Lase Natal Readers", Journal of Southern African Studies, Vol. 35, No. 3 (Sep., 2009), pp. 595–607.
 Magema Fuze: The Making of a Kholwa Intellectual. University of KwaZulu-Natal Press, 2011.

References

External links

Women historians
Living people
Year of birth missing (living people)
University of Cape Town alumni
Columbia University faculty
Academic staff of the University of the Witwatersrand
Historians of South Africa
Intellectual historians
South African women academics